Lynwood is a small southeastern suburb of Perth, the capital city of Western Australia. Its local government area is the City of Canning.

History
Lynwood was first settled by Henry Willett of Willett & Co, who was granted Canning Location 21 on the Canning River (which included nearby Parkwood) and settled in the area in June 1832. In November 1964, the Shire of Canning proposed the names "Burtsdale" and "Willetton" for Willetton and Lynwood/Parkwood respectively, the name Burtsdale honouring Septimus Burt, who purchased the land in 1882. In August 1965, developers at Lynwood requested the name "Clovercrest Estate", but finally agreed to "Lynwood". The name Willetton was shifted westwards and Lynwood was gazetted in December 1965. Parkwood was part of Lynwood until 1993.

In the 1960s and 1970s, Lynwood and neighbouring Parkwood were largely settled by new migrants from the United Kingdom who arrived in Perth seeking economic prosperity. Large parcels of land were developed by the British firm Realty Development Corporation (RDC) and heavily marketed to the new English migrants upon their arrival as "home & land packages".

Geography

The Bannister Creek Park runs through the southern part of Lynwood.

Facilities
Lynwood is a residential suburb with a series of parks connecting along Bannister Creek and parallel to Nicholson Road. It contains a neighbourhood shopping centre with supermarket, post office, estate agency, and a number of food outlets, as well as a community hall and a primary school completed in 2010, which also services the adjoining suburb of Ferndale. Lynwood Senior High School, built in 1975, is in nearby Parkwood.

Parkwood Shopping Centre was built in 1979, but has recently been demolished due to low patronage and now only consists of a few convenience stores and a small medical clinic. The Lynwood Arms Hotel, a local pub on Metcalfe Road, built in the early 1970s, was demolished in 2014 to make way for an upmarket medium-density housing development.

Transport
Lynwood is served by Transperth bus services from Cannington, which link it to the central business district. All services are operated by Swan Transit.

Politics
Lynwood has a changing mixed-ethnic population. It generally supports the Australian Labor Party at both federal and state elections.

References

External links

Suburbs of Perth, Western Australia
Suburbs in the City of Canning